Palpifer falkneri is a moth of the family Hepialidae. It is found in Nepal.

References

Moths described in 1968
Hepialidae